The two Remus class locomotives were  broad gauge locomotives operated by the South Devon Railway, England. They were ordered for working goods trains on the West Cornwall Railway but were also used on passenger trains.

The two Remus class locomotives were similar to the Dido class but with slightly larger wheels. They were built by the Avonside Engine Company.

On 1 February 1876 the South Devon Railway was amalgamated with the Great Western Railway, the locomotives were given numbers by their new owners but continued to carry their names.

Locomotives
 Remus (Avonside 662 of 1866); GWR no. 2154; withdrawn 1886
 Romulus (Avonside 661 of 1866); GWR no. 2155; withdrawn 1892

The names, like many other locomotives of this era, came from classical mythology. Romulus and Remus were the traditional founders of Rome.

References

 
 
 
 
 Railway company records at The National Archives

Broad gauge (7 feet) railway locomotives
0-6-0ST locomotives
Remus
Avonside locomotives
Railway locomotives introduced in 1866
Scrapped locomotives